"High Heeled Shoes" is the debut single by English singer Megan McKenna. It was released through digital stores and streaming services on 6 September 2017, alongside its B-side, "Far Cry from Love". The song peaked at number 43 on the UK Singles Chart.

Commercial performance
The song peaked at number one on iTunes in the United Kingdom, "Far Cry from Love" also peaked at number two, McKenna celebrated success on Twitter posting, "OMG I AM OVERWHELMED! I am Currently No. 1 & 2 on iTunes! Thankyou guys so so much! I love you all for believing in me". On 8 September 2017, the song entered the UK Singles Chart at number 43.

Track listing

Charts

Release history

References

2017 songs
2017 debut singles
Megan McKenna songs
Songs written by Nick Southwood